The coat of arms of the Russian Republic of Karelia is crossed in three equal parts with the colors of the flag of Karelia on a shield with a profile of a rampant black bear. The golden frame of the shield comes into stylized image of a fir tree on the left and a pine tree on the right. In the upper part of the shield there is an octagonal star (doubled cross) of gold. The arms were created by Yu. S. Nivin.

The current coat of arms of Karelia has much resemblance with the coat of arms of the independent Republic of Uhtua, the national symbol of East Karelia created by Finnish artist Akseli Gallen-Kallela. The main difference is that the bear was holding a billhook. The shield had the traditional Varangian colours and there were polar lights above of shield.

Sources
 Constitution of the Republic of Karelia, paragraph 13.
 The official site of the republic

See also
 Emblem of the Karelo-Finnish SSR 1941–1956
 Coat of arms of the Province of Karelia in Finland
 Coat of Arms of the Governorate of Finland

Republic of Karelia
Karelia
Karelia
Karelia
Karelia
Karelia